Cat Lake may refer to:

 Cat Lake (Ontario), a Canadian lake
 Cat Lake Airport, a Canadian airport operated by the Government of Ontario
 Cat Lake First Nation, Ontario, Canada